IQR may refer to:
 Interquartile range, a measure of statistical dispersion
 IQR code, an alternative to existing QR codes developed by Denso Wave
 The Integrated Qualifications Register, a public register of worker qualifications awarded in Poland
 Information Quality Ratio, a normalized variant of the mutual information